Kusu (Kutsu) is a Bantu language of Maniema Province, Democratic Republic of the Congo.

Gengele creole is reported to be partly based on Kusu.

References

Tetela languages